The Triumph of Doubt: Dark Money and the Science of Deception is a book by David Michaels that was published in 2020.

An adaptation of material from the book was published in January 2020 in Boston Review.

Overview
Triumph of Doubt begins with an introductory first chapter and an overview chapter entitled "The Science of Deception." Most subsequent chapters then focus on ways that corporations have with greater or lesser success managed to obscure public understanding of scientific findings regarding specific types of products or concerns. For example, individual chapters focus on chemicals ("The Forever Chemicals," Chapter 3), concussions experienced by football players ("The NFL's Head Doctors," Chapter 4), opioids ("On Opioids," Chapter 7), climate change ("The Climate Denial Machine," Chapter 11), and sugar ("Sickeningly Sweet," Chapter 12).

Reviews and interviews

Triumph of Doubt has been reviewed in Science Magazine, 
Nature,
Undark Magazine,
by the Union of Concerned Scientists,
and in the San Francisco Review of Books (blog).

Interviews with Michaels about the book have been published in Salon,
in the Chronicle of Higher Education,
and in E&E News.

Editions

See also
 Doubt Is Their Product: How Industry's Assault on Science Threatens Your Health (2008) by David Michaels

References

2020 non-fiction books
Books about the politics of science
Political books
Professional ethics
Doubt
Books about multinational companies
Books about health
Environmental non-fiction books
Books about media manipulation
Medical controversies
Tobacco control
Oxford University Press books